American colonies may refer to:

 American Colonies, a 2001 book by Alan Taylor
Thirteen Colonies, which became the United States of America in 1776
 United Colonies, name of the United States used in 1775 until September 1776
 European colonization of the Americas
 American imperialism

See also
 United States territorial acquisitions
 Chronology of the colonization of North America
 Colonial history of the United States
 European colonization of the Southern United States
 Former colonies and territories in Canada